Abraham ben Solomon of Torrutiel (Utiel, Valencia) was a Spanish Jewish historian of the early 16th century.

References

Jews expelled from Spain in 1492
16th-century Moroccan Jews
Moroccan people of Spanish-Jewish descent
Jewish historians
Year of birth unknown
Year of death unknown